BM Habitat Mall is a shopping mall in the Indian city of Mysore, Karnataka. It is located behind the BM hospital in Jayalakshmipuram.

About the mall
It houses DRC Cinemas, the city's first multiplex, with four screens. The first Easyday Supermarket (Bharti Enterprises Group) in South India opened at BM Habitat Mall Mysore. The space has been occupied by Big Bazaar which is now known as Smart Bazaar. Some of the branded merchandise establishments in the mall include Reliance Digital, Pantaloons woman, Apple ideation, Fastrack, One plus, Max, US polo flying machine and Chemmanur international Jewelers - their 1st showroom in Karnataka and 47th branch internationally. Branded eateries such as KFC (Kentucky Fried Chicken) and the first outlet of Barbeque Nation in Mysore are located in this mall.

See also
Easyday
List of shopping malls in India

References

Shopping malls in Mysore
Shopping malls established in 2011
2011 establishments in Karnataka